Scott Alexander Young (April 14, 1918 – June 12, 2005) was a Canadian journalist, sportswriter, novelist and the father of musicians Neil Young and Astrid Young.  Over his career, Young wrote 45 books, including novels and non-fiction for adult and youth audiences.

Early life
Born in Cypress River, Manitoba, Young grew up in nearby Glenboro, Manitoba, where his father, Percy Andrew Young, owned a drug store. His mother was Jean Ferguson Paterson. After his father went broke in 1926, the family moved to Winnipeg, but were unable to afford to stay there. His parents separated in 1930, and he went to live with an aunt and uncle in Prince Albert, Saskatchewan, for a year before moving back to Winnipeg to live with his mother. He left high school at 16 and began working for a tobacco wholesaler.

Young began writing while in his teens, submitting stories to various publications, most of which were rejected. At the age of 18, in 1936, he was hired as a copyboy at the Winnipeg Free Press and was soon made sports reporter. He met Edna Blow "Rassy" Ragland in 1937 and the two were married in 1940.

Moves to Toronto
Unable to get a raise at the Free Press, Young moved to Toronto in 1941, covering news and sports for the Canadian Press news agency. His first son, Bob Young, was born in 1942 and five months later, Young was sent to England to help cover World War II for CP. He came back a year later and joined the Royal Canadian Naval Reserves, where he served as a Communications Officer until his release from the service when the war ended in 1945. Young returned to CP and soon joined Maclean's magazine as an assistant editor. His second son, Neil Young, was born in Toronto in November 1945.

Young began to sell fiction to publications in Canada and the United States including the Saturday Evening Post and Collier's. He quit his job at Maclean's in 1948 to write short stories full-time.

In 1949, Young bought a house in Omemee, Ontario, near Peterborough. The family's finances would vary with Young's success in selling his stories and he began taking assignments from Sports Illustrated. His first novel The Flood was published in 1956. Young moved to Pickering, Ontario and spent a year working in public relations for a jet engine company before joining The Globe and Mail as a daily columnist in 1957 and moving back to Toronto. In 1959, Young met Astrid Mead while on assignment in British Columbia. Soon after, he and Edna separated. Following Young's divorce in 1961, he married Mead. They had a daughter, Astrid Young, in 1962.

He was also a host on Hockey Night in Canada until getting on the wrong side of Toronto Maple Leafs co-owner John Bassett. The Leafs threatened HNIC's sponsor and advertising agency until they agreed to fire Young.

Life on the farm
In 1967, Young bought a  farm near Omemee in Cavan Township and built a house there. In 1969, he asked to be transferred to the Globe'''s news bureau in Ottawa. Shortly after arriving in Ottawa, he got into a dispute with his paper over the publication rights to excerpts from a book he had just written with Punch Imlach. The rights had been acquired by the Toronto Telegram, but the Globe wouldn't allow Young's writing to appear in a competing newspaper. He quit the Globe and accepted a job offer from Bassett to become sports editor and columnist at the Telegram, moving back to Toronto within weeks of his move to Ottawa. Young remained at the Telegram until the paper folded in 1971. He then rejoined the Globe and Mail. Young and his second wife separated in 1976, and in the fall of 1977, he moved in with fellow Globe writer Margaret Hogan. The two married in 1980. At the same time, Young had a falling out with the Globe over stories critical of Imlach written by Donald Ramsay and quit. He worked with former Toronto Maple Leafs owner Conn Smythe on Smythe's autobiography, which would be published after Smythe's death in November 1980.

In 1980s, he wrote a series of detective stories that featured Inuit detective Matthew "Matteesie" Kitologitak, including "The Shaman's Knife" and "Murder in A Cold Climate".

In 1988, Young received the Elmer Ferguson Memorial Award from the Hockey Hall of Fame as selected by the Professional Hockey Writers' Association. He was later inducted into the Manitoba Hockey Hall of Fame.

Young and his wife sold the farm in the late 1980s and moved to Howth, Ireland, a suburb of North Dublin. In 1990, Young received an honorary doctorate from Trent University and donated many of his papers to the university's archives. The Youngs returned to Omemee in 1992 and repurchased their old farm, which Young owned for the rest of his life. Scott Young Public School in Omemee was named in his honour in 1993. His autobiography, A Writer's Life, was published in 1994.

He wrote a book on his life with his son Neil, Neil and Me, in 1984.

He and Margaret moved to Kingston, Ontario, in 2004, where he died the following year at age 87.

Notes

References

 Scott Young, A Writer's Life, Doubleday Canada, 1994
 Scott Young, Neil And Me, McClelland and Stewart, 1984
 Michael Power, "Scott Young recalled as a 'gentleman'", Peterborough This Week, June 15, 2005
 "Writer Scott Young dies at 87; Covered all major sporting events; Wrote 45 books during career", Toronto Star'', June 14, 2005. pg. E03

External links
CBC Profile on Young
Scott Young Public School
Scott Young papers at Trent University

1918 births
2005 deaths
20th-century Canadian non-fiction writers
20th-century Canadian male writers
20th-century biographers
Elmer Ferguson Award winners
Canadian biographers
Canadian male non-fiction writers
Canadian sportswriters
Canadian television sportscasters
Male biographers
People from Westman Region, Manitoba
Royal Canadian Navy personnel of World War II
The Globe and Mail columnists
Writers from Winnipeg
Neil Young